The 2009 Korea National League Championship was the sixth edition of the Korea National League Championship. Amateur club Gumi Siltron was invited to the competition.

Group stage

Group A

Group B

Group C

Group D

Knockout stage

Bracket

Quarter-finals

Semi-finals

Final

See also
2009 in South Korean football
2009 Korea National League

References

External links
Schedule at Korea National League 

Korea National League Championship seasons
K